Liptena bassae, the Bassa liptena, is a butterfly in the family Lycaenidae. It is found in western Nigeria. The butterfly's habitat consists of drier forests.

References

Butterflies described in 1926
Liptena
Endemic fauna of Nigeria
Butterflies of Africa